Otopleura nodicincta, common name the nodulose pyram,  is a species of sea snail, a marine gastropod mollusk in the family Pyramidellidae, the pyrams and their allies.

Description
The white shell is covered with spiral rows of chestnut spots. The whorls of the teleoconch are angulated above, with longitudinal ribs produced into nodules at the angles. The lower part of body whorl is pitted, forming a sort of network between the pits. The length of the shell varies between 11 mm and 25 mm.

Distribution
This marine species occurs in the following locations:
 Indo-Pacific Region
 Aldabra
 the Philippines, Guam, French Polynesia
 Japan

References

 Higo, S., Callomon, P. & Goto, Y. (1999). Catalogue and bibliography of the marine shell-bearing Mollusca of Japan. Osaka. : Elle Scientific Publications. 749 pp.
 Barry D. Smith (2003), Prosobranch gastropods of Guam, Micronesica 35-36:244-270. 2003
  Jean Tröndlé and Michel Boutet, Inventory of Marine Molluscs of French Polynesia, ATOLL RESEARCH BULLETIN #570, 2008

External links
 To Encyclopedia of Life
 To USNM Invertebrate Zoology Mollusca Collection
 To World Register of Marine Species
 

Pyramidellidae
Gastropods described in 1855